Twelve Girls and One Man (German: Zwölf Mädchen und ein Mann) is a 1959 Austrian comedy film directed by Hans Quest and starring Toni Sailer, Margit Nünke and Gunther Philipp.

It was shot at the Rosenhügel Studios in Vienna.The film's sets were designed by the art directors Theodor Harisch and Fritz Jüptner-Jonstorff.

Synopsis
A detective goes undercover at an Alpine ski resort following a series of robberies, while at the same time twelve female students arrive there on holiday.

Cast
 Toni Sailer as Florian Thaler
 Margit Nünke as Eva, genannt 'Amazone'
 Gunther Philipp as Anderl Seidl, Hilfsgendarm
 Gerlinde Locker as Rosel Fuchs
 Joe Stöckel as Bürgermeister Fuchs
 Ernst Waldbrunn as Josef Walz - Gendarmerieposten-Kommandant
 Helga Schlack as Monika, genannt 'Mondänika'
 Veronika Bayer as Mäuschen, 'Die Unscheinbare'
 Ursula Heyer as Ruth 'Die Pedantische'
 Grit Boettcher as Do 'Lady Superfein'
 Martha Hauser as Coco, 'Der Papagei'
 Rosemarie Kirstein as Grit, 'Miß Kurvenreich' 
 Lisbeth Gemzell as Sweety, 'Die wandelnde Konditorei'
 Eva Iro as Lizzi, 'Die Junke-Box'
 Ingemarie Tramm as Mimi, 'Mimosa, die Gekränkte' 
 Susanne Cronau as Vera 'Die Nahrhafte'
 Monika Berger as Sabine, 'Die Handgestrickte'
 Wolf Neuber as Der stramme Max
 Raoul Retzer as Gentleman-Schorschi
 Rudolf Strobl as Rittmeister Lanz

References

Bibliography 
 Elisabeth Büttner & Christian Dewald. Anschluss an Morgen: eine Geschichte des österreichischen Films von 1945 bis zur Gegenwart. Residenz Verlag, 1997.

External links 
 

1959 films
Austrian comedy films
1959 comedy films
1950s German-language films
Films directed by Hans Quest
Films shot at Rosenhügel Studios
UFA GmbH films